The Joseph Garneau Jr. House, later called the Thomas Kilpatrick House or the Garneau–Kilpatrick House, is located at 3100 Chicago Street in the Gifford Park neighborhood of Omaha, Nebraska, United States. Built in 1890 for cracker magnate Joseph Garneau Jr., it changed hands in 1903 when Garneau moved to New York City to set up a wine importing business.  Thomas Kilpatrick lived in the house until his death in 1916.

The Romanesque Revival style of the house led to it be designated an Omaha Landmark in 1980; it was listed on the National Register of Historic Places in 1981. The house is now referred to as “The Palace” by the current tenant, the Omaha Chapter of the Delta Chi Fraternity.

See also
History of Omaha
Neighborhoods of Omaha, Nebraska

References

Houses on the National Register of Historic Places in Omaha, Nebraska
Omaha Landmarks